Rauðhólar may refer to the following volcanic landforms:

Rauðhólar (Reykjavík), Iceland
Rauðhólar (Vesturdalur), Iceland